Corydalis omeiana is a species of flowering plant in the family Papaveraceae, native to central Sichuan province of China. It has gained the Royal Horticultural Society's Award of Garden Merit.

References

omeiana
Endemic flora of China
Flora of South-Central China
Plants described in 2007